A Dream of Fair Women is a poem by Alfred Tennyson. It was written and published in 1833 as "A Legend of Fair Women", but was heavily revised for republication under its present tile in 1842. 

The opening lines of the poem are:

The poem was inspired by Geoffrey Chaucer's The Legend of Good Women (1384). Both works feature Cleopatra and deal with the misfortunes of illustrious women.

Samuel Beckett's 1932 Dream of Fair to Middling Women parodies Tennyson's title and alludes to his and Chaucer's poems.

References

External links 

 "A Dream of Fair Women". The Literature Network. Retrieved 11 May 2022.

1833 poems
Poetry by Alfred, Lord Tennyson